DJMax Portable Black Square (Korean: 디제이맥스 포터블 블랙 스퀘어, dijeimaegseu poteobeul beullaeg seukweeo; abbr.: DMP:BS) is a music game for the PlayStation Portable developed by South Korean developer Pentavision released on December 24, 2008. This is the fourth major game of the DJMax series released for the PSP. The game includes various enhancements and new features built on from DJMax Portable 2 and DJMax Portable Clazziquai Edition. The original aim was to launch the game in November, however due to numerous bugs or piracy issues with DJMax Portable Clazziquai Edition, the release of DJMax Portable Black Square was postponed. The game was released in Japan on March 22, 2012, it removes the autocorrect feature and Japanese is the only language option available, yet most of the game retains English titles for songs, artwork and so on.

Features 
DJMax Black Square features largely the same features as Clazziquai Edition, but with increased difficulty and an almost completely different song list. It has the same user interface as Clazziquai Edition, but with a different "Bling Style" theme. In Black Square, 2B Mode, which was featured in Clazziquai Edition, has been removed. 8B Mode has been re-introduced into the series and has been renamed 6BFX Mode for this release. Black Square features note auto-correction which corrects the notes player misses. Black Square has an enhanced Fever bonus which can go up to a x7 multiplier. Black Square also has an extended Club Tour mode.

In Black Square, a specialized note appears that's a different color than the rest, hitting these notes gives the player 1,000 bonus points and 1,000 extra points every time they hit another note of the same kind (ex: hit once in a row: 1,000, hit twice in a row, 2,000, hit ten times in a row: 10,000). The note also has a penalty - the music stops if it is missed. The music starts playing again when the next special note is hit, and the extra points are reset to 1000. Black Square introduces RD (Redesign) song patterns to the game series. Some songs have a special pattern, called RD style, that appears in the place of MX patterns on the song selection screen. This pattern is a remixed version of the song, and is usually harder. The RD songs can also be listened to on a special disc in Album Mode. Players can use Link Disc feature with DJMax Portable Clazziquai Edition, allowing them to play the songs of Clazziquai Edition along with song patterns and RD patterns unique to Black Square. Link Disc with DJMax Portable 1 and 2 is also possible but only unlocks avatars, songs, notes, and gears for Black Square.

As with DJ Max Fever, DJMax Portable Black Square prevents the transfer of save files by associating the saved data with the MAC address of the PSP. If a save file is transferred to a PSP either by swapping memory sticks or downloading, the game recognizes the mismatch and refuses to load the game data. This can be circumvented using a MAC address spoofer. However, if the player puts the save file on a different Memory Stick, and uses the Memory Stick on the same PSP the Save File is created on, the data will still load.

Releases
Black Square was released in three different packages in Korea: the normal retail edition, a limited edition and two-in-one limited package which has both normal retail versions of Clazziquai Edition and Black Square. In Japan, the game is set to be released in normal and limited editions.

Limited Edition 

A limited collector's edition package called DJMax Portable Black Square - Quattra Limited Edition was also released in limited quantities. Only 1,500 of these were manufactured. Black Square is the fourth title in the DJMax series and the name for this special package is derived from Italian word "Quattro" which means number "four". The package itself is a black cube. A two-day pre-order event was held for people whom wanted to reserve this package for themselves. On December 6, 2008, the first 1,000 packages of the limited edition became available for pre-order and later on December 7, 2008, the last 500 packages became available.

The limited edition is delivered in a package called DJMax Portable Black Square Premium Limited case which has a magnet-based door mechanism. It contains a retail version of the DJMax Portable Black Square PSP game, an original soundtrack which consists of four audio CDs, an art book called Illusion: DJMAX Metro Project Visualization Book containing notes about the development of the game, graphical art and credits with pictures of every developer. The package also has small portable speakers, a Black Square themed bandana, a 2009 new year's card, and a Son of Sun Special Gift which consists of plant seeds and a cup. The package also has a few other items included although they aren't mentioned in the product description. These additional items are a TECHNIKA IC Card: Black Square Edition, a Black Square limited package cover and a NB Ranger 3D paper figure.

The Japanese limited edition contains an art book, four CDs and the Japanese version of the game.

Track Listing

References

External links 
DJMAX Portable Black Square Official Site
DJMAX Portable Official Site
PentaVision Official Site
Chinese DJMAX website

2008 video games
CyberFront games
Portable Black Square
Multiplayer and single-player video games
Music video games
PlayStation Portable games
PlayStation Portable-only games
Turntable video games
Video games developed in South Korea
Video games scored by Shinji Hosoe